Luis Margani is a film and television actor.

He works in the cinema of Argentina.

Filmography
 Negocios (1995) 
 Mundo Grúa (1999) Crane World 
 Una noche con Sabrina Love (2000) aka A Night with Sabrina Love 
 La Fiebre del Loco (2001) aka Loco Fever 
 La Fuga (2001) aka The Escape 
 Navidad en el placard (2004)
 El Favor (2004)
 Tus ojos brillaban (2004) 
 El Escape de Gaspar (2004) 
 Dar de nuevo (2005) 
 Un Minuto de silencio (2005)
 Toro (2005)
 Recortadas (film) (2008)

Television
 "Luna salvaje" (2000) TV Series aka Wild Moon 
 "Enamorarte" (2001) TV Series aka Young Lovers 
 "Cuatro amigas" (2001) Mini TV Series aka Four Friends 
 "Los Buscas de siempre" (2000) TV Series aka The Searches 
 "Costumbres argentinas" (2003) TV Series aka Family Affairs 
 "Resistiré" (2003) TV Series aka Forever Julia 
 "Mujeres asesinas" TV Series
 "El Presidente" (2020) TV Series

References

External links
 

Living people
1956 births
Argentine male film actors
Place of birth missing (living people)